Petherbridge is a surname. Notable people with the surname include:

 Alan Petherbridge (born 1927), athlete
 Edward Petherbridge (born 1936), English actor, writer and artist
 George Petherbridge (1927–2013), football player
Louise Petherbridge (born 1931), New Zealand actor, director, deviser, producer and lecturer
Mary Petherbridge (1870–1940), English indexer and founder of the Secretarial Bureau
 Thomas Topham Petherbridge, land owner